Seyyed Hoseyn (also Romanized as Seyyed Ḩoseyn; also known as Seyyed Ḩasan) is a village in Poshtkuh-e Rostam Rural District, Sorna District, Rostam County, Fars Province, Iran. At the 2006 census, its population was 62, in 12 families.

References 

Populated places in Rostam County